The 2015 Six-red World Championship (often styled the 2015 SangSom 6-red World Championship for sponsorship and marketing purposes) was a six-red snooker tournament that was held between 7 and 13 September 2015 at the Fashion Island Shopping Mall in Bangkok, Thailand.

Stephen Maguire was the defending champion, but lost 4–6 against Judd Trump in the last 32.

Thepchaiya Un-Nooh won in the final 8–2 against Liang Wenbo.

Prize money
The breakdown of prize money for this year is shown below:
 Winner: 2,500,000 baht
 Runner-up: 1,000,000 baht
 Semi-finalists: 500,000 baht
 Quarter-finalists: 250,000 baht
 Last 16: 125,000 baht
 Last 32: 62,500 baht
 Group stage: 31,250 baht
 Total: 8,000,000 baht

Round-robin stage
The top four players from each group qualified for the knock-out stage. All matches were best of 9 frames.

Group A

 Stephen Maguire  2–5  Pankaj Advani
 Liang Wenbo  5–2  Hassan Kerde
 Alan Trigg  3–5  Thanawat Thirapongpaiboon
 Stephen Maguire  1–5  Thanawat Thirapongpaiboon
 Liang Wenbo  5–1  Alan Trigg
 Hassan Kerde 0–5  Pankaj Advani
 Stephen Maguire 5–3 Alan Trigg
 Liang Wenbo 1–5 Pankaj Advani
 Hassan Kerde 2–5 Thanawat Thirapongpaiboon
 Alan Trigg 0–5 Pankaj Advani
 Liang Wenbo 5–3 Thanawat Thirapongpaiboon
 Stephen Maguire 5–2 Hassan Kerde
 Alan Trigg 5–4 Hassan Kerde
 Stephen Maguire 1–5 Liang Wenbo
 Pankaj Advani 2–5 Thanawat Thirapongpaiboon

Group B

 John Higgins  4–5  Yuan Sijun
 Matthew Selt  5–3  Muhammad Sajjad
 Anthony McGill  5–4  Boonyarit Keattikun
 John Higgins  5–3  Boonyarit Keattikun
 Matthew Selt  2–5  Anthony McGill
 Muhammad Sajjad  5–4  Yuan Sijun
 John Higgins 3–5 Muhammad Sajjad
 Matthew Selt 5–2 Boonyarit Keattikun
 Anthony McGill 5–1 Yuan Sijun
 John Higgins 3–5 Anthony McGill
 Muhammad Sajjad 5–3 Boonyarit Keattikun
 Matthew Selt 5–2 Yuan Sijun
 John Higgins 1–5 Matthew Selt
 Yuan Sijun 1–5 Boonyarit Keattikun
 Anthony McGill 5–4 Muhammad Sajjad

Group C

 Judd Trump  5–0  Ahmed Galal
 Michael White  5–3  Muhammad Asif
 Kristján Helgason  5–3  Noppadon Noppachorn
 Michael White  4–5  Noppadon Noppachorn
 Muhammad Asif 5–0 Ahmed Galal
 Judd Trump 5–1 Noppadon Noppachorn
 Michael White 2–5 Kristján Helgason
 Ahmed Galal 1–5 Noppadon Noppachorn
 Judd Trump 5–1 Michael White
 Kristján Helgason 5–4 Muhammad Asif
 Michael White 5–1 Ahmed Galal
 Muhammad Asif 5–3 Noppadon Noppachorn
 Judd Trump 5–1 Kristján Helgason
 Judd Trump 5–2 Muhammad Asif
 Kristján Helgason 5–2 Ahmed Galal

Group D

 Ben Judge  5–4  Ehsan Heydari Nezhad
 Ding Junhui  5–1  Phaitoon Phonbun
 Graeme Dott  1–5  Michael Holt
 Graeme Dott  5–0  Ben Judge
 Michael Holt  5–3  Phaitoon Phonbun
 Michael Holt 5–2 Ehsan Heydari Nezhad
 Graeme Dott 5–1 Phaitoon Phonbun
 Ding Junhui 5–0 Ben Judge
 Ding Junhui 3–5 Ehsan Heydari Nezhad
 Graeme Dott 5–1 Ehsan Heydari Nezhad
 Ding Junhui 4–5 Michael Holt
 Ben Judge 1–5 Phaitoon Phonbun
 Ehsan Heydari Nezhad 0–5 Phaitoon Phonbun
 Ding Junhui 5–4 Graeme Dott
 Michael Holt 3–5 Ben Judge

Group E

 Soheil Vahedi  2–5  Noppon Saengkham
 Stuart Bingham  5–0  Soheil Vahedi
 Mark Davis  5–2  Yan Bingtao
 Craig MacGillivray  3–5  Noppon Saengkham
 Stuart Bingham  5–3  Yan Bingtao
 Craig MacGillivray  2–5  Soheil Vahedi
 Mark Davis  5–3  Noppon Saengkham
 Yan Bingtao 5–4 Soheil Vahedi
 Stuart Bingham 3–5 Noppon Saengkham
 Mark Davis 5–1 Craig MacGillivray
 Stuart Bingham 1–5 Mark Davis
 Craig MacGillivray 1–5 Yan Bingtao
 Mark Davis 5–2 Soheil Vahedi
 Yan Bingtao 5–3 Noppon Saengkham
 Stuart Bingham 5–3 Craig MacGillivray

Group F

 Joe Perry  5–2 Thor Chuan Leong
 Robert Milkins  5–1  Asjad Iqbal
 Matthew Stevens  2–5 James Wattana
 Asjad Iqbal  5–2  James Wattana
 Joe Perry  2–5  Matthew Stevens
 Joe Perry  5–0  Robert Milkins
 Thor Chuan Leong  1–5  James Wattana
 Matthew Stevens 5–1 Asjad Iqbal
 Asjad Iqbal 5–3 Thor Chuan Leong
 Joe Perry 5–4 James Wattana
 Robert Milkins 5–1 Matthew Stevens
 Robert Milkins 5–0 Thor Chuan Leong
 Robert Milkins 5–1 James Wattana
 Joe Perry 4–5 Asjad Iqbal
 Matthew Stevens 2–5 Thor Chuan Leong

Group G

 Darren Paris  1–5  Jamie Clarke
 Darren Paris  3–5  Thepchaiya Un-Nooh
 Marco Fu  5–1  Peter Francisco
 Mark Williams  2–5  Jamie Clarke
 Marco Fu  5–2  Jamie Clarke
 Darren Paris  1–5  Peter Francisco
 Mark Williams  5–4 Thepchaiya Un-Nooh
 Jamie Clarke 2–5 Thepchaiya Un-Nooh
 Marco Fu 5–4 Darren Paris
 Mark Williams 5–3 Peter Francisco
 Marco Fu 1–5 Mark Williams
 Peter Francisco 4–5 Thepchaiya Un-Nooh
 Jamie Clarke 5–1 Peter Francisco
 Marco Fu 4–5 Thepchaiya Un-Nooh
 Mark Williams 5–1 Darren Paris

Group H

 Ryan Day  5–0 Wael Talat
 Mark Selby  5–1  Joe Swail
 Ken Doherty  5–1  Akani Songsermsawad
 Ryan Day  5–1 Joe Swail
 Akani Songsermsawad 5–0 Wael Talat
 Mark Selby 5–2 Ken Doherty
 Ryan Day 5–1 Akani Songsermsawad
 Ken Doherty 1–5 Joe Swail
 Mark Selby 5–1 Wael Talat
 Wael Talat 1–5 Joe Swail
 Mark Selby 5–0 Akani Songsermsawad
 Ryan Day 3–5 Ken Doherty
 Ken Doherty 5–3 Wael Talat
 Joe Swail 2–5 Akani Songsermsawad
 Mark Selby 4–5 Ryan Day

Knockout stage

Maximum breaks 
(Note: A maximum break in six-red snooker is 75.)
 Judd Trump (2 times)
 Ken Doherty
 Liang Wenbo

Highest break: Mark Davis: 80

References

External links
 

2015
2015 in Thai sport
2015 in snooker
September 2015 sports events in Thailand